Furor was a  of the Spanish Navy that fought at the Battle of Santiago de Cuba during the Spanish–American War.

Technical characteristics
Furor was built in the United Kingdom by Thomson, (which would rename itself Clydebank Engineering & Shipbuilding Co. the following year). Her keel was laid on 21 February 1896, and she was completed on 21 November 1896.  She had three funnels. In the parlance of the day, she was a "torpedo boat destroyer", designed to protect larger ships against torpedo boat attack, but also carrying torpedoes with which to attack larger ships herself.

Operational history
As tensions between Spain and the United States grew in early 1898, Furor was part of the Spanish Navy's 1st Squadron, commanded by Vice Admiral Pascual Cervera y Topete. The squadron was ordered to concentrate at São Vicente in Portugal's Cape Verde Islands. The ships had experienced mechanical problems and burned an excessive amount of coal during the voyage.

The Spanish–American War began while Furor was at São Vicente. Ordered by neutral Portugal in accordance with international law to leave São Vicente within 24 hours of the declaration of war, Furor and the rest of Cervera's squadron departed on 29 April 1898, bound for San Juan, Puerto Rico. Because of continuing engine trouble and low coal supplies, Furor and her fellow destroyers were towed part of the way. Cervera's ships reached French-owned Martinique in the Lesser Antilles on 10 May 1898.

While the other ships loitered in international waters, Furor and Terror went into Fort-de-France to ask for coal. France was neutral and would not supply coal.  Moreover, the American auxiliary cruiser  had just left port, and French officials announced that in accordance with international law and France's neutrality, the destroyers, as belligerents, could not leave port until 48 hours after Harvard had left, i.e., on 13 May 1898. Terror had become immobilized with engine problems, so the destroyer flotilla commander, Captain Fernando Villaamil, took Furor out in the harbor on 12 May 1898 under the ruse of testing her engines, then successfully made a dash out into international waters 24 hours early.

Leaving Terror behind, Furor and the rest of Cervera's squadron set out on 12 May 1898 for Dutch-owned Curaçao, where Cervera expected to meet a collier. Cervera arrived at Willemstad on 14 May, but the Netherlands also was neutral, and strictly enforced its neutrality by allowing only Vizcaya and Infanta Maria Teresa to enter port and permitting them to load only 600 tons of coal. On 15 May, Cervera's ships departed, no longer bound for San Juan, which by now was under a U.S. Navy blockade, but for as-yet unblockaded Santiago de Cuba on the southeastern coast of Cuba, arriving there on 19 May 1898.  Cervera hoped to refit his ships there before he could be trapped. His squadron was still in the harbor of Santiago de Cuba when an American squadron arrived on 27 May 1898 and began a blockade which would drag on for 37 days.

During the blockade, Furor and the others endured occasional American naval bombardments of the harbor; during one such bombardment on 6 June 1898, she took a shell hit in her bunkerage, but suffered no serious damage. Some of her men joined others from the fleet in a Naval Brigade to fight against a U.S. Army overland drive toward Santiago de Cuba.

By the beginning of July 1898, that drive threatened to capture Santiago de Cuba, and Cervera decided that his squadron's only hope was to try to escape into the open sea by running the blockade. The decision was made on 1 July 1898, with the break-out set for 3 July 1898. The crew of Furor spent 2 July 1898 returning from Naval Brigade service and preparing for action. Furor was to be the fifth ship in line during the escape, following the four armored cruisers and with Pluton behind her; while Infanta Maria Teresa sacrificed herself by attacking the fastest American ship, the armored cruiser , Furor and the others were to avoid action, put on all the speed they could, and run for the open sea.

At about 0845 hours on 3 July 1898, the Spanish ships got underway. The U.S. squadron sighted the Spanish ships in the channel at about 0935, and the Battle of Santiago de Cuba began.

While the four armored cruisers turned to starboard to run westward, Furor and Pluton turned inside them and made their run closer to the coast. The blockading American battleships and armored cruisers opened fire on the two destroyers as they emerged from the channel, hitting both destroyers several times, but then turned their attention to pursuing the Spanish cruisers. The two damaged destroyers put on speed, pursued only by the armed yacht , a ship less well armed than the destroyers, but larger, faster, and undamaged. Gloucester hit both destroyers repeatedly. In short order, casualties aboard Furor began to climb, and her stern flooded and became submerged; all her boilers were destroyed and her engine damaged; fires broke out in several places, including a particularly bad one in the engine room, which lay over the shell room, causing a danger of explosion; a hole was punched in her side; and finally her steering failed.

Too badly damaged to continue, Pluton ran herself aground at 1045 on the beach just west of Cabanas Bay. Now alone, Furor survived only five more minutes. Still firing her guns, but with half her crew killed or wounded and clearly doomed, Furor stuck her colors and began to lower her boats; several American projectiles struck Spanish sailors struggling in the water before the Americans realized she had surrendered. Two American boats came alongside and began to take off survivors, but quickly pushed away again fearing an imminent magazine explosion, which promptly occurred. Furor sank about a mile offshore in deep water at 1050.

Captain Villaamil died aboard Furor, as did over half of her crew. Those of her crew who got ashore had to beware of Cuban insurgents, who began shooting Spanish sailors they found along the shore. Other survivors were recovered by U.S. sailors in small boats.

Notes

References
 Cervera, Pascual, Ed. Office of Naval Intelligence War Notes No. VII: Information From Abroad. The Spanish–American War: A Collection of Documents Relative to the Squadron Operations in the West Indies Arranged by Rear-Admiral Pascual Cervera y Topete, Translated from the Spanish. Washington, D.C.: Government Printing Office, 1899.
 Chesneau, Roger, and Eugene M. Kolesnik, Eds. Conway's All The World's Fighting Ships 1860–1905. New York, New York: Mayflower Books Inc., 1979. .
 Nofi, Albert A. The Spanish–American War, 1898. Conshohocken, Pennsylvania: Combined Books, Inc., 1996. .

External links
 The Spanish–American War Centennial Website: Torpedo-Boat Destroyers Furor, Pluton, and Terror
 Department of the Navy: Naval Historical Center: Online Library of Selected Images: Spanish Navy Ships: Furor (Destroyer, 1896–1898)

 

Furor-class destroyers
Ships built on the River Clyde
1896 ships
Spanish–American War destroyers of Spain
Shipwrecks in the Caribbean Sea
Shipwrecks of the Spanish–American War